Frederick Henry Scott (21 October 1885 – 20 April 1937) was an Australian rules footballer who played with Fitzroy in the Victorian Football League (VFL).

Notes

External links 

1885 births
1937 deaths
Australian rules footballers from Victoria (Australia)
Fitzroy Football Club players
People from Yarra Ranges